John Walter Ripley (June 29, 1939 – October 28, 2008) was a decorated United States Marine Corps Colonel who received the Navy Cross for his actions in combat during the Vietnam War.  On Easter morning 1972, Captain Ripley repeatedly exposed himself to intense enemy fire over a three-hour period as he prepared to blow up an essential bridge in Dong Ha. His actions significantly hampered the North Vietnamese Army's advance into South Vietnam.  The story of "Ripley at the Bridge" is legendary in the Marine Corps and is captured in a gripping diorama at the United States Naval Academy.

On October 28, 2009, the first biography about Col. Ripley was published. It was written by Norman Fulkerson and is titled An American Knight, The Life of Col. John W. Ripley.

Marine career
John Walter Ripley was born on June 29, 1939, in Radford, Virginia and his family lived there until he was five years old. They then moved to Portsmouth, Ohio, where they remained for some years before finally settling in Radford, Virginia. After graduating from Radford High School, John Ripley enlisted into the Marine Corps in 1957 at 17 years of age. A year later, he was appointed to the U.S. Naval Academy by the Secretary of the Navy. He graduated in 1962 with a Bachelor of Science degree in electrical engineering, and received his commission as a second lieutenant. After his sea duty, he joined 2nd Battalion, 2nd Marines. In May 1965, Ripley was transferred to 2nd Force Reconnaissance Company, and after training, he deployed to Vietnam with his platoon.

In October 1966, Ripley joined 3rd Battalion, 3rd Marines in South Vietnam. He served as company commander of Lima Company, known as Ripley's Raiders, was wounded in action, then returned to active duty and completed his combat tour.
In October 1969, Capt Ripley was selected to serve as exchange officer with the British Royal Marines and Special Boat Service.

During his two years of Vietnam service, he participated in 26 major operations.  In addition to numerous decorations for extensive combat experience at the rifle company and battalion levels, Ripley was awarded the Navy Cross for extraordinary heroism in destroying the Dong Ha bridge during the April 1972 North Vietnamese Easter Offensive (also known as the Nguyen Hue Offensive). That action is memorialized at the Naval Academy with a large diorama titled "Ripley at the Bridge."

While under intense unrelenting enemy fire, Ripley dangled for an estimated three hours under the bridge in order to attach 500 pounds of explosives to the span, ultimately obliterating it. His action, conducted under enemy fire while going back and forth for materials, definitively thwarted an onslaught by 20,000 enemy troops and dozens of tanks and was the subject of a book, The Bridge at Dong Ha, by Colonel John Grider Miller. He attributes his success to the help of God and his mother. When his energy was about to give out he began a rhythmic chant, "Jesus, Mary, Get me there". His body taxed to its extreme limits, his action is considered one of the greatest examples of concentration under fire in the annals of U.S. military history.

Following his tours in Vietnam, Capt Ripley was promoted to major on 1 June 1972. Ripley served with Marine Force Reconnaissance; served as the military aide to General Snowden and Chief of Staff of the Marine Corps during the late 1970s. As a lieutenant colonel, Ripley assumed command of 1st Battalion, 2nd Marines from July 1979 to May 1981.  During this time they deployed for Combined Arms Exercise 2-80, then to the Mountain Warfare Training Center. Upon completion of his tour with the 2nd Marines, LtCol Ripley attended Naval War College in Newport, Rhode Island, graduating in 1982.  He then reported to the Joint Staff, Joint Chiefs of Staff, serving as Political-Military Planner and branch chief, European Division, J-5. Ripley was next assigned to the United States Naval Academy where he served as senior Marine and director, Division of English and History from 1984 to 1987. He was promoted to colonel on 1 July 1984.  Col Ripley next spent a year as assistant chief of staff, G-3, with 3rd Marine Expeditionary Force, Okinawa, Japan. Ripley assumed command of 2nd Marine Regiment, Camp Lejeune, North Carolina from 14 July 1988 to 19 July 1990. The 2d Marines deployed twice as a regiment to Norway. Colonel Ripley was next assigned to the U.S. Naval Academy, where he served as senior Marine and director, Division of English and History from 1984 to 1987. His final tours in the Marine Corps were in charge of the NROTC detachments at Oregon State University and the Virginia Military Institute, and as the senior Marine at the United States Naval Academy teaching English and history.  He earned the "Quad Body" distinction for making it through four of the toughest military training programs in the world: the Army Rangers, Marine Reconnaissance, Underwater Demolition Team and Britain's Royal Marines Commandos, according to Miller's book. He was the first Marine officer to be inducted in the U.S. Army Ranger Hall of Fame.  Ripley retired from the Marine Corps in 1992 after 35 years of active duty service.  He received more than five awards for his acts of bravery in Vietnam.

Post-active duty

After his retirement from active duty in 1992, Ripley became president and chancellor of Southern Seminary College for Women (now Southern Virginia University) in Buena Vista, Virginia. In 1997, Ripley stepped down as the head of Southern Seminary and headed to Chatham, Virginia where he took charge of Hargrave Military Academy as the private military boarding school's eighth president, remaining in command for two years. He was selected in 1999 by the Commandant of the Marine Corps as the director of the History and Museums Division.

On June 26, 1992 (a month before he retired from the Marine Corps) Col. Ripley testified against women in the military before a presidential commission. He based his arguments on a defense of "femininity, motherhood, and what we have come to appreciate in Western culture as the graceful conduct of women." In the following year he spoke against homosexuals in the military during the House Armed Services Committee hearings that preceded the implementation of President Clinton's "Don't ask, don't tell" policy.

As a result of combat action, Colonel Ripley contracted a disease that in the summer of 2002 required a liver transplant.  Nearing death, with little time left and already having received Last Rites twice, a replacement liver was located.  The Commandant of the Marine Corps, who called Col. Ripley a living symbol of pride, sent a section of CH-46s helicopters from the Marine One presidential squadron to Philadelphia to retrieve the liver.  After further coordination with the Washington D.C. Police to obtain a landing zone in the city, the liver was delivered in time for a successful transplant.

In October 2006, John Ripley returned to the site of the Dong Ha Bridge to film a documentary of his action.  The documentary was hosted by Oliver North, and was shown on November 12, 2006, on Fox News.

Awards and decorations

In 2002, he also became the very first Marine officer to receive the "Distinguished Graduate Award", the highest and most prestigious award given by the United States Naval Academy.  Also, in May 2004, Marines of the 22nd Marine Expeditionary Unit named a Forward Operating Base after him "FOB Ripley" (now Multi National Base Tarin Kot) in south-central Afghanistan.

In July 2006, the Naval Academy Preparatory School in Newport, Rhode Island dedicated its new dormitory as "Ripley Hall", honoring their former graduate.

On June 11, 2008, Ripley  became the first Marine to be inducted into the U.S. Army Ranger Hall of Fame — honored for the assault on the Dong Ha Bridge, on Easter morning 1972.

On Tuesday November 11, 2008, Veteran's Day, Ripley's hometown of Radford, VA held a ceremony in memory of him.  It had been originally intended to be in honor of him, but he died a couple weeks before the ceremony took place.  His son was presented with a key to the city and a plaque declaring November 11, 2008, John W Ripley day in Radford, VA.

Navy Cross citation
Citation:
The President of the United States of America takes pleasure in presenting the Navy Cross to Captain John W. Ripley (MCSN: 0-84239), United States Marine Corps, for extraordinary heroism on 2 April 1972 while serving as the Senior Marine Advisor to the Third Vietnamese Marine Corps Infantry Battalion in the Republic of Vietnam. Upon receipt of a report that a rapidly moving, mechanized, North Vietnamese army force, estimated at reinforced divisional strength, was attacking south along Route #1, the Third Vietnamese Marine Infantry Battalion was positioned to defend a key village and the surrounding area. It became imperative that a vital river bridge be destroyed if the overall security of the northern provinces of Military Region One was to be maintained. Advancing to the bridge to personally supervise this most dangerous but vitally important assignment, Captain Ripley located a large amount of explosives which had been pre-positioned there earlier, access to which was blocked by a chain-link fence. In order to reposition the approximately 500 pounds of explosives, Captain Ripley was obliged to reach up and hand-walk along the beams while his body dangled beneath the bridge. On five separate occasions, in the face of constant enemy fire, he moved to points along the bridge and, with the aid of another advisor who pushed the explosives to him, securely emplaced them. He then detonated the charges and destroyed the bridge, thereby stopping the enemy assault. By his heroic actions and extraordinary courage, Captain Ripley undoubtedly was instrumental in saving an untold number of lives. His inspiring efforts reflected great credit upon himself, the Marine Corps, and the United States Naval Service.

Silver Star citation
Citation:
The President of the United States of America takes pleasure in presenting the Silver Star to Captain John Walter Ripley (MCSN: 0-84239/1653859), United States Marine Corps, for conspicuous gallantry and intrepidity in action while serving as Commanding Officer of Company L, Third Battalion, Third Marines, THIRD Marine Division, in connection with operations against the enemy in the Republic of Vietnam. On 21 August 1967, Company L was assigned the mission of reinforcing a convoy that had been surprised by a large enemy force and was pinned down. With one rifle platoon, a small command group, and accompanied by two M-42 dual 40-mm. anti-aircraft guns, Captain Ripley was leading the relief column when it suddenly came under intense enemy automatic weapons and recoilless rifle fire. Disregarding his own safety and the heavy volume of hostile fire, he moved to the machine gun mounted on the vehicle and opened fire, pinpointing the location of the well concealed North Vietnamese and enabling the 40-mm. guns to deliver accurate fire on the enemy positions. Directing his unit to dismount, he quickly organized a defensive perimeter while coordinating supporting artillery fire and simultaneously controlling the remainder of his company which was widely separated from his position. Repeatedly exposing himself to the hostile fire, he directed artillery fire and air strikes upon the attacking enemy force and courageously adjusted fire missions to within fifty meters of his position. Throughout the following three hours, his skillful employment of supporting arms and direction of the fire of his men repulsed the determined enemy attacks and forced the hostile units to flee in panic and confusion. His aggressiveness and outstanding professionalism were an inspiration to all who served with him and were instrumental in the successful extraction of his unit from an extremely hazardous situation. By his steadfast courage, superb leadership and unfaltering devotion to duty at great personal risk, Captain Ripley upheld the highest traditions of the Marine Corps and of the United States Naval Service.

Death 
Ripley died suddenly on October 28, 2008, at his home in Annapolis, Maryland of undetermined causes at age 69 and was  buried at the United States Naval Academy graveyard. He was survived by his son, Stephen, by his wife of 44 years, the former Moline Blaylock; a sister, Mary Susan Goodykoontz who died in 2015; two other sons, Thomas and John; a daughter, Mary Ripley; nine grandchildren; and one great grandchild.
Moline Blaylock Ripley died on September 12, 2009, from complications due to Alzheimer's disease, at the age of 68.

When he died, his son Thomas related at his funeral that Commandant James L. Jones visited him in his hospital bed accompanied by Color Sergeant of the Marine Corps Sgt Jewel and the Battle Colors. He told Ripley, "The Colors don't leave the room until you do."  He was buried with full military honors on November 7 at the United States Naval Academy Cemetery.

See also

References

Further reading
 John Grider Miller, The Bridge at Dong Ha (Annapolis, MD: U.S. Naval Institute Press, 1996). 
 
 Norman J. Fulkerson, An American Knight: The Life of Col. John W. Ripley (Spring Grove, PA: York Press, 2008).

External links
 
 An American Knight: The Life of Colonel John W. Ripley USMC
 
 

1939 births
2008 deaths
Recipients of the Navy Cross (United States)
People from Radford, Virginia
Recipients of the Silver Star
Recipients of the Legion of Merit
Recipients of the Gallantry Cross (Vietnam)
Recipients of the Distinguished Service Order (Vietnam)
United States Marine Corps colonels
United States Naval Academy alumni
United States Marine Corps personnel of the Vietnam War
Military personnel from Virginia
United States Marine Corps officers